The 10th Annual Pop Corn Music Awards of 2000, at the Club Fever, in Athens, Greece. The awards recognized the most popular artists and albums in Greece from the year 2000 as voted by Greek music publication Pop Corn. The event was hosted by Maria Mpakodimou & Fotis Sergopoulos in the 2001. The Pop Corn Music Awards were discontinued in 2002.

Performances

Winners and nominees

References 

2000 music awards
2000